Urban means "related to a city".  In that sense, the term may refer to:

 Urban area, geographical area distinct from rural areas
 Urban culture, the culture of towns and cities

Urban may also refer to:

General
 Urban (name), a list of people with the given name or surname
 Urban (newspaper), a Danish free daily newspaper
 Urban contemporary music, a radio music format
 Urban Dictionary
 Urban Outfitters, an American multinational lifestyle retail corporation
 Urban Records, a German record label owned by Universal Music Group

Place names in the United States 
 Urban, South Dakota, a ghost town
 Urban, Washington, an unincorporated community

See also 
 Pope Urban (disambiguation), the name of several popes of the Catholic Church
 Urban cluster (disambiguation)